Tenilapine is an atypical antipsychotic which has never been marketed in the US.

Pharmacodynamics
Tenilapine has a relatively high affinity for the 5-HT2A receptor, and relatively low (micromolar) affinities for dopamine receptors.

The ratio of D2 to D4 bonding is similar to that of clozapine. Like many other atypical antipsychotics, it is a potent 5-HT2C antagonist.

References

Atypical antipsychotics
Piperazines
5-HT2A antagonists
5-HT2B antagonists
Thiophenes
Heterocyclic compounds with 3 rings
Nitriles